Sir Albert Reuben Atkey (1 July 1867 – 9 November 1947) was a Conservative Party politician in the United Kingdom.

Biography
At the 1918 general election, standing as a Coalition Conservative, he was elected as Member of Parliament (MP) for the new Nottingham Central constituency.  At the 1922 election, he lost the seat by a majority of only 22 votes to the Liberal Party candidate, Reginald Berkeley.  He stood again in 1923, but Berkeley was returned with a majority of 1,805, and Atkey did not stand for Parliament again.

Instead he concentrated on local politics and became Sheriff of Nottingham in 1910 and Lord Mayor of Nottingham in 1928. His term of office as Lord Mayor is best remembered for the opening of Nottingham Council House by the Prince of Wales (later Edward VIII) on 22 May 1929. Atkey was a prominent businessman and founded A.R. Atkey Ltd, the first motor traders in Nottingham. He was knighted in 1935.

References

External links 
 

1867 births
1947 deaths
Conservative Party (UK) MPs for English constituencies
UK MPs 1918–1922
Sheriffs of Nottingham
Lord Mayors of Nottingham